Luisa Rivelli (born 10 February 1930) is an Italian film actress. She appeared in 50 films between 1951 and 1994.

Selected filmography
 La figlia del diavolo (1952)
 They Were Three Hundred (1952)
 Passionate Song (1953)
 It's Never Too Late (1953)
 The Rival (1956)
 Supreme Confession (1956)
 The Law (1959)
 Treasure of the Petrified Forest (1965)
 Lightning Bolt (1965)
 Me, Me, Me... and the Others (1966)
 The Big Gundown (1966)
 Rough Justice (1970)

References

External links

1930 births
Living people
Italian film actresses
20th-century Italian actresses
People from the Province of Varese